Árja ("Commitment" in northern Sami) is a Norwegian Sami political party. The party was founded on 24 May 2008 in Jergul, and its leader is Láilá Susanne Vars. The ideology of the party is claimed to be based on respect for the elderly in society and traditionally based education. Otherwise, the party wants a more open and available Sami Parliament, criticises the Sami Parliament for neglecting traditionally Sami values and society, and thus wants to strengthen the rights for the rural and coastal population.

The party put up lists in five out of seven constituencies, and ran for its first Sami parliamentary election in 2009 where it immediately broke through as the third largest party, with 10% of the votes and three parliamentary representatives.

Singer Fred Buljo is associated with Árja and represented the party between 2013 and 2017.

Electoral history

References

Indigenous organisations in Norway
Political parties established in 2008
Sámi associations
Sámi politics